Derek O'Brien (born 14 November 1979) is an Irish footballer.

Playing career
O'Brien is a left winger with plenty of speed and trickery. He was an integral part of Galway United's first season back in the Premier Division in 2007. So much so that he was elected to the PFAI Premier Division Team of the Year and he was subsequently voted Galway United player of the year for 2007. He also won the Galway United Supporter's Trust (GUST) 2007 player of the year award. O'Brien was subject to interest from Derry City who are believed to have offered him an excellent deal, however he opted to commit himself to the Tribesmen for another season at least. In July 2008 he signed for St Patrick's Athletic from Galway United. He stayed at Pats for the remainder of the season before returning to Galway United in January 2009. 
He signed for Cork City in February 2011. Following his release from Cork at the end of their 2011 League of Ireland First Division winning season, O'Brien joined Limerick. He was a member of the Limerick squad which won the 2012 First Division title. After leaving the Blues, he joined Salthill Devon before the 2013 season.

O'Brien spent the first half of the 2013 season at Salthill Devon before joining Longford Town in July 2013 for the remainder of the year.

Honours

Club
Cork City
League of Ireland First Division (1): 2011

Limerick
League of Ireland First Division (1): 2012
Munster Senior Cup (1): 2011-12

Individual
 PFAI Premier Division Team of the Year - 2007
 PFAI First Division Team of the Year - 2006

References

External links
 Galway United official website

1979 births
Living people
Association footballers from County Kerry
Republic of Ireland association footballers
Cork City F.C. players
Galway United F.C. players
Sligo Rovers F.C. players
St Patrick's Athletic F.C. players
Longford Town F.C. players
League of Ireland players
Salthill Devon F.C. players
Tralee Dynamos A.F.C. players
Association football midfielders